William S. Burroughs (1914–1997) was an American writer and visual artist.

William Burroughs may also refer to:
William Seward Burroughs I (1857–1898), American inventor
William S. Burroughs Jr. (1947–1981), American novelist
Sir William Burroughs, 1st Baronet (c. 1753–1829), Attorney General of Bengal and MP for Enniskillen, Colchester and Taunton

See also
William Burrows (disambiguation)
William Burrough (disambiguation)